Zurab Beridze may refer to:

 Zurab Beridze (swimmer) (born 1979), Georgian swimmer
 Zurab Beridze (diplomat) (born 1958), Georgian diplomat